Keuruu sub-region  is a subdivision of Central Finland and one of the Sub-regions of Finland since 2009.

Municipalities
Keuruu (10,522)
Multia (1,846)

Politics
Results of the 2018 Finnish presidential election:

 Sauli Niinistö   65.0%
 Pekka Haavisto   7.8%
 Laura Huhtasaari   7.8%
 Paavo Väyrynen   7.1%
 Matti Vanhanen   6.0%
 Tuula Haatainen   3.8%
 Merja Kyllönen   2.2%
 Nils Torvalds   0.3%

Sub-regions of Finland
Geography of Central Finland